The Jordan News Agency (In Arabic: وكالة الأنباء الأردنية) (Shortly Petra)  is the news agency of Jordan.

History
Petra was established on 16th of July, 1969, as an independent body linked to the ministry of information. It became an independent entity in June 2004, following the dissolution of the ministry of information. A special ordinance was enacted to give PETRA financial and administrative independence and to specify the powers of the agency's board and those of the director general. The new ordinance grants the agency the right to sell some of its services to willing subscribers. The ordinance defines services that could be sold as:

 Items in the photos, news and documents archives
 Special news services requested by local and foreign organizations
 Services of the T.V. unit and leasing its equipments
 Professional, media press and technical training
 Special news bulletin
 Advertisement on its website

Services provided by the agency

 The daily newsletter in Arabic with an average of 100 news stories per day
 The daily newsletter in English with an average of 35 news items per day
 Photographs, an average of 25 photos per day
 Training Center Services
 TV Unit Services
 News archive contains more than one million news
 The digital photo archive contains 110,000 photos
 SMS Service

Affiliation and correspondence
PETRA is an active member in the Federation of Arab News Agencies (FANA), and the Non-Aligned Countries' News Agencies Pool.

The agency has correspondents in Cairo, Copenhagen, New York City, Tokyo, Bonn, Paris, Gaza, Ramallah, Abu Dhabi, Doha, Bahrain, Moscow, London, Kuwait, Kuala Lumpur, Beijing, Sana'a, Bucharest, Baghdad, Manama and Beirut.

Technical development
Petra has come a long way since news bulletins were distributed internally through systems that feed communication lines and the mechanical Teleprinter, that later changed to computer sets, PETRA has now fully computerized news services.

 In 1976, PETRA started to transmit news on VHF short waves to the Arab world and Europe for 6 hours/day.
 In 1992, PETRA computerized its press activities: reception and dispatching of news and archiving.
 In 1994, PETRA developed its archive system by using an Oracle Database and high capacity storage equipment.
 By virtue of an agreement signed with the UPI in 1995, PETRA started to transmit news through satellite that reaches all parts of the world.
 In 1997, PETRA developed with UNESCO support an electronic photo archiving system that helped the agency to store more than 100,000 photos out of 500,000 photos it owns that depict some very important events in the history of Jordan and the region.
 In 1998, PETRA got Internet connection; it launched its first website of news and photos. Frequent upgrades have been conducted on the website to cope with the latest information and technological developments.
 In 1999, PETRA introduced a new version of its news system (nepras) to confront the Y2K threat. The new version integrated the data, photo and documents archiving systems.
 In 2001, PETRA introduced a program enabling its journalists in local governorates and abroad to access the nepras system through the Internet. By virtue of this system, journalists can access nepras wherever they are, create their news reports and pass them to the editing page.
 In 2004, PETRA developed programs that allow automatic upgrading of news and photos on its website. It also introduced an electronic monitoring system that records news bulletins, store them electronically and use them in Petra's bulletins.
 PETRA is currently using an internal system linked to two servers working with Windows 2003 operating system.

See also
 Federation of Arab News Agencies (FANA)

References

External links
 Petra News Agency 
 Petra News Agency 
  

News agencies based in Jordan
Arab news agencies
Divisions and subsidiaries of the prime ministry (Jordan)
1969 establishments in Jordan
Government agencies established in 1969